Derebaşı is a village in the Pazar District, Rize Province, in Black Sea Region of Turkey. Its population is 379 (2021).

History 
According to list of villages in Laz language book (2009), name of the village is Tsuk'it'a, which means "laurel tree". Most villagers are ethnically Laz and Hemshin.

Geography

References

Villages in Pazar District, Rize
Laz settlements in Turkey